Arif Ahmad oglu Mammadov (Azerbaijani: Arif Əhməd oğlu Məmmədov) is a PhD-holding Azerbaijani engineer-economist, who serves as the Director of the State Civil Aviation Agency under the Ministry of Digital Development and Transport of Azerbaijan. Throughout his extensive career, Arif Mammadov was awarded with the Taraggi Medal and the Shohrat Order for his contribution to the development of civil aviation of the Republic of Azerbaijan.

Education 
In 1979, Arif Mammadov graduated from the Leningrad Civil Aviation College with honours. Further straightening his education, Arif Mammadov graduated from the Kyiv Institute of Civil Aviation Engineers in 1988.

Career 
From 1979 to 1996, Arif Mammadov held various positions within Civil Aviation Authority of the Republic of Azerbaijan. He was the General representative of the State Concern Azerbaijan Airlines in Turkey from 1996 until 2000.

In the period of 2000–2008, he worked as the Head of the Coordination and Foreign Relations Department and as the Deputy Director General of the State Concern of the Azerbaijan Airlines.

Arif Mammadov was appointed as the Director of State Civil Aviation Administration of the Republic of Azerbaijan on February 7, 2008. On July 16, 2008, he was also appointed the Chairman of State Civil Aviation Collegium.

In the period of 2013–2016, he worked as the vice-president of the Azerbaijan Airlines Closed Joint Stock Company.

In 2016, he was appointed as the Director of the State Civil Aviation Administration of the Republic of Azerbaijan. From 2018 Arif Mammadov was appointed as the Director of the State Civil Aviation Agency under the Ministry of Transport, Communications and High Technologies of the Republic of Azerbaijan.

Personal life 
Arif Mammadov was born on April 18, 1960, in Baku, Azerbaijani SSR, then part of the Soviet Union. He is married and has two children.

Awards 
  - 29.05.2013 - Taraggi Medal
  - 17.04.2020 - Shohrat Order

See also
Cabinet of Azerbaijan
 Azerbaijan Airlines

References 

Living people
Government ministers of Azerbaijan
1960 births